Anthem Records discography

Catalog number formats and distribution
The catalog number formats listed below apply to the majority of Anthems releases since 1977.  Singles and promos follow different rules and there are also a few oddities listed at the bottom.  Also, Columbia House and BMG Direct versions of Anthem Products do not follow the formats listed below consistently.

Under Polydor
Anthem officially formed in May 1977.  Initially, the label was distributed by Polydor (now a part of Universal), but that only lasted until March 1978.  During that time, release numbers 1001 to 1012 (possible 1013 as well) were issued with the catalog number format ANR-Z-XXXX (vinyl) and 8AN-Z-XXXX (8-track) where Z is either the number of discs or sides (for vinyl) and the X's represent the release number.

Under Capitol-EMI
Beginning in March 1978 until October 1989, Anthem was distributed by Capitol-EMI (now Capitol Records; also now a part of Universal).  During this time, budget vinyl reissues of some titles were released with the catalog number format ANR-Z-6XX where Z is either the number of discs of the number of sides and the X's represent the last two digits of the release number.  Budget versions appear for at least the first twelve releases (possibly more).

During this time, 8-tracks were replaced with cassettes and the catalog number format became 4AN-Z-XXXX.  Also during this time the first Anthem compact discs were introduced with the catalog number format ANC-Z-XXXX.

Under CBS/Sony
Beginning in October 1989 until October 1995, Anthem was distributed by CBS (under Sony).  Under CBS/Sony various catalog number formats were introduced to represent different price codes:  ANK-XXXX, VANK-XXXX and WANK-XXXX (the V and W indicate budget versions).

Under MCA/Universal
Universal is Anthem Record's current distributor and has been since October 1995 (initially as MCA).  Since the label had become even more "Rush-centric", catalog number formats used were: ANMD-XXXX for Rush releases and ANBD-XXXX for non-Rush releases.

Beginning in 1999 with Queensrÿche's Q2K, the current Anthem catalog number format was introduced: 66825-XXXX-Y where Y describes the format and the X's are, once again, the release number.  This format sometimes appears with spaces instead of dashes, or as one undivided number.  This number is derived from the barcode prefix that Anthem had been using since at least the eighties.

Releases

Main

Other

Anthem Records
Discographies of Canadian record labels
Rock music discographies